is a Japanese comedian. He performs tsukkomi in the double act Impulse. His partner is Toshiyuki Itakura.

Tsutsumishita is represented with Yoshimoto Creative Agency.

Biography
In their junior high school and high school days, Tsutsumishita and Itakura belonged to the baseball club. Although Tsutsumishita was initially a substitute while serving as a captain at the Takeboshi High School Baseball club, he became the starting first baseman even though he had uniform number 13.

He formed Impulse in 1998 with his NSC classmate Toshiyuki Itakura. Before the formation, Tsutsumishita had formed a combi Plus 2 Ton with another NSC classmate, and at that time played the boke.

In September 2005, he published a photograph collection titled Otoko Utsushi with photographs by Itakura.

On 27 September 2008, Tsutsumishita was arrested for driving 80 kmh on an ordinary road with a speed limit of 50 km.

On 6 March 2010, he was involved in a multiple car collision Ryuji Akiyama of the comedy trio Robert. Akiyama suffered minor injuries.

On the 29 December 2010 broadcast of Haneru no Tobira Tsutsumishita made an on-air marriage proposal to Miki Matsuki (松枝美希) during the year-end special show. Matsuki, a former Kishidan back dancer and leading member of the OZ-MAX with DJ Ozma, accepted by dancing with Tsutsumishita. It was revealed on the 11 May broadcast that the couple registered their marriage on 3 March 2011. His wife's pregnancy was announced in the programme in November, and their eldest daughter was born on 24 January 2012.

On 14 June 2017, he was found by a police officer to be in a groggy state in the driver's seat of a car after having taken sleeping pills. Tsutsumishita was put on suspension by his agency, Yoshimoto Kogyo, and was allowed to return to television activities in late 2018.

Filmography

Television

Dramas

Films

Advertisements

Books

Discography

References

External links
 

Japanese comedians
1977 births
People from Yokohama
Kanto Gakuin University alumni
Living people